The Pattington Apartments are a complex of 72 apartments in the Uptown neighborhood of Chicago, Illinois, United States, that is listed on the National Register of Historic Places.

Description
At the date of construction in 1902, the building was the largest apartment complex in Chicago. The building is built with bay windows in a courtyard style.

The building was designed by architect David E. Postle and was added to the National Register of Historic Places March 8, 1980. The Pattington annex was designed by Andrew Sandegren.

See also

 National Register of Historic Places listings in North Side Chicago

References

External links

 

Residential buildings completed in 1902
Residential buildings on the National Register of Historic Places in Chicago
Historic districts on the National Register of Historic Places in Illinois